Bolesław Konstanty "Bill" Gebert (22 July 1895 – 13 February 1986) was a top Communist Party official, remembered as one of the organization's top Polish-language speaking leaders. He was a Soviet agent during the years of World War II and was an official of the Polish Communist government after the war.

Background

Bolesław Konstanty Gebert was born July 22, 1895, in Tatary, near Tykocin, in the Białystok region, near the current border of Poland and Belarus. His family were farmers who lost their noble status and landed estates after Gebert's grandfather, Adolf Gebert, took part in the January Uprising in 1863–1864.

Gebert's father, Konstanty Gebert (1856–1941), was a soldier in the Polish Legions in World War I and later fought in the Polish–Soviet War, taking part in the defence of Warsaw. A farmer by trade, he was an active member of the peasant Polish People's Party "Wyzwolenie", for which he was imprisoned in 1923. He continued his military service during the Invasion of Poland in 1939 and was a prisoner of war in the Kozielsk Soviet camp. After his release, Konstanty Gebert was a member of the Home Army resistance movement during World War II, along with three of his four brothers, Mieczysław, Henryk, and Aleksander. The latter brother and Bill Gebert's uncle, Aleksander Gebert, was later persecuted for his resistance service by the Communists in post-War Poland.

Career
Gebert immigrated from Poland to the United States prior to the Russian Revolution and found work as a miner.

Political career
By 1915, Gebert was an active member of the Socialist Party of America working in the SPA's Polish Federation.  He took part in the creation of the Kosciuszko League.  In 1919, he was active in the Left Wing Section of the Socialist Party and became a founding member of the Communist Party of the USA (CPUsA), for which he edited a Polish socialist newspaper.  In the Palmer Raids at year-end 1919, he was arrested but not deported.

In 1920, Gebert was named to the governing Central Executive Committee of the CPA as an ostensible representative of the Polish Communist Federation in the wake of the deportation of Polish leader Daniel Elbaum.  By that time, he was in Detroit, Michigan and editor of the three primary Polish-language publications: Głos Robotniczy (Workers' Voice), Trybuna Robotnicza (The Workers' Tribune), and Głos Ludowy (People's Voice).  In 1929, he served as Secretary of the Polish Bureau of the Workers (Communist) Party and was a fraternal delegate to the party's 6th National Convention, held in New York City in March 1929.

In 1932, Gebert co-founded the Polonia Society from an existing Polish-language section of the International Workers Order (IWO).  He also became a national officer of the IWO.  Up to the mid-1930s, he also served as organizer of the CPUSA's Chicago and Pittsburgh districts. (Later, Louis F. Budenz described of a conflict between Gebert and Morris Childs, District Organizer for Illinois, over Gebert's intrusion into Chicago and, in particular, over a "Czech comrade who was doing vital underground work for Gebert.")

In 1936 Gebert helped found the Steel Workers Organizing Committee (SWOC) of the Congress of Industrial Organizations (CIO), for which he organized fraternal organizations of foreign-born Americans. Toward year-end, he organized a conference of fraternal organizations in Pittsburgh — a gathering attended by 447 representatives of various national origins, addressed by Philip Murray and greeted by John L. Lewis.

During the 1930s, Gebert was a frequent contributor to the theoretical monthly of the CPUSA, The Communist.

Gebert  appears in nine intercepted NKGB messages between May and October 1944.  Gebert was the contact of fellow Soviet agent, Oskar Lange, a Polish economist who was a personal emissary from President Franklin D. Roosevelt to Joseph Stalin on the "Polish question". Another Venona message reports Gebert's demand for a $500 balance the KGB still owed him on a one thousand dollar contract to publish a Polish-language book.

After World War II, Gebert returned to the now Communist-dominated Poland, where he assumed a leading position in the state-controlled labor unions. From 1949 to 1950, Gebert was Secretary of the World Peace Council and from 1950 to 1957, the editor of Glosu Pracy.

He returned to the United States in 1950 as United Nations representative of the World Federation of Trade Unions.

From 1960 to 1967 Gebert served as the Polish People's Republic's Ambassador to Turkey.

Personal life and death

Gebert married two times.  In 1920 in the US, he married Romanian-born Elvira Koenig (1898–1974); they had one son, Armand Gebert (1922–2009), a journalist who lived and died in Detroit. Later in Poland, he married Krystyna Poznańska-Gebert (1916–1991), of Jewish origin; they had two children: a daughter and son, Konstanty Gebert (born 1953), a Polish journalist and Jewish activist.

Gebert died age 90 on February 13, 1986, in Warsaw.

Works

Books
Factionalism – the enemy of the auto workers (with William Weinstone) Detroit, Communist Party of Michigan 1938
 New Poland. Introduction by Arthur Upham Pope. New York: Polonia Society of the International Workers Order, 1945.
 Polacy w amerykańskich związkach zawodowych : notatki i wspomnienia. Kraków: n.p., 1976.
 Z Tykocina Za Ocean (From Tykocin Beyond the Ocean). Warszawa: Czytelnik, 1982. —Autobiography.

Articles
 "Trotskyism, Vanguard of the Counter-revolutionary Bourgeoisie," The Communist, vol. 13, no. 1 (January 1934), pp. 62–71.
 "Check-Up on Control Tasks in the Chicago District," The Communist, vol. 13, no. 7 (July 1934), pp. 711–717.
 "The General Strike in Terre Haute," The Communist, vol. 14, no. 9 (September 1935), pp. 800–810.
 "Our Tasks in Developing Activity Within the Company Unions," The Communist, vol. 15, no. 1 (January 1936), pp. 47–57.
 "The United Mine Workers' Union Convention," The Communist, vol. 15, no. 3 (March 1936), pp. 211–219.
 "The Steel Workers Give Their Mandate for Organization," The Communist, vol. 15, no. 6 (June 1936), pp. 498–507.
 "Smashing Through Barriers to the Organization of the Steel Workers," The Communist, vol. 15, no. 8 (August 1936), pp. 759–768.

References

External links
FBI Venona file
Budenz, Louis, Men Without Faces: The Communist Conspiracy In America. New York: Harper, 1950, pgs. 55–58, 60–61, 252.
Haynes, John Earl and Klehr, Harvey, Venona: Decoding Soviet Espionage in America New Haven: Yale University Press, 1999, pgs. 234, 235, 239.
Klehr, Harvey, The Heyday of American Communism: The Depression Decade. New York: Basic Books, 1984.
 Ottanelli, Fraser M., The Communist Party of the United States: From the Depression to World War II. New Brunswick, NJ: Rutgers University Press, 1991.
 Storch, Randi, Red Chicago: American Communism at its Grassroots, 1928–35. Urbana, IL: University of Illinois Press, 2007.
 "W Polsce nie jestem sam" (I Do Not Feel Alone in Poland), an interview with Robert Mazurek, "Przekroj," Issue 28, 2010. http://www.przekroj.pl/ludzie_rozmowy_artykul,7197.html?print=1

1895 births
1986 deaths
People from Tykocin
People from Łomża Governorate
Congress Poland emigrants to the United States
American people of Polish descent
Members of the Socialist Party of America
Members of the Communist Party USA
Polish United Workers' Party members
Ambassadors of Poland to Turkey
American people in the Venona papers
American spies for the Soviet Union
Burials at Powązki Military Cemetery
Recipients of the Order of the Banner of Work
Commanders of the Order of Polonia Restituta
Recipients of the Gold Cross of Merit (Poland)